Ramon Perez may refer to:

 Ramón Pérez de Ayala (1880-1962), Spanish writer
 Ramon Perez Blackburn (1927-2018), American entertainer
 Ramón Pérez (footballer) (born 1963), Chilean footballer
 Ramon Perez (politician) (born 1971), American politician

See also
 Esteban Ramón Pérez (born 1989), American artist